Diocese of Down can refer to:

The present-day Church of Ireland united Diocese of Down and Dromore
The present-day Roman Catholic Diocese of Down and Connor
The Diocese of Down, which in each church was formally a diocese under its own bishop and is now a constituent part of each of the united dioceses